Les Kiss (born 9 December 1964) is an Australian professional rugby union coach who is the head coach of London Irish in the Gallagher Premiership. He is a former professional rugby league footballer who played in the Brisbane Rugby League and New South Wales Rugby League and a former professional rugby league coach who was the head coach at the London Broncos in the Super League. 

In rugby union he has previously been assistant head coach of Ireland and the Director of Rugby at Ulster.

Playing career 
Kiss was a Past Brothers junior who went on to play 100 first grade games in the NSWRL Premiership for the North Sydney Bears between 1986 and 1993. A handy goalkicker, he had an injury-restricted career, and retired in 1993.

Les Kiss scored only 29 tries for Norths in his 100 games but despite not being the fastest , and with a best haul of 9 tries in a season (1986), he was considered to be one of the best defensive wingers in the Sydney competition. He also kicked 38 goals from 64 attempts (59.38%) for the Bears with his best season again being his debut year (1986) when he kicked 23/38 at 60.53%.

Representative career
Les Kiss was originally from Bundaberg in Queensland, and played his first senior football with the Fortitude Valley Diehards club in the Brisbane Rugby League competition in 1985. He first gained selection for The Maroons in Game 2 of the 1986 State of Origin series at the Sydney Cricket Ground. Playing on the wing, Kiss scored a try on debut in a losing side (NSW won the 1986 series 3–0) and he scored another in Game 3 at Lang Park.

Benefiting from an injury to fellow Queenslander Dale Shearer, Kiss was then selected to play for Australia in the second test against New Zealand at the Cricket Ground and retained his spot for the final game in Brisbane.

Kiss' good form continued for the Bears and he was an easy selection for the 1986 Kangaroo Tour. Before the actual tour got underway in England, the Australians played a test against Papua New Guinea in Port Moresby. There Kiss scored his only two test tries in a 62–12 win. He was then selected for the first Ashes test against Great Britain at Old Trafford with the Aussie's winning 38-16 before an injury in a tour match against Halifax in the game following the first test put an end to his tour. His place in the test side was taken by speed Manly-Warringah outside back Dale Shearer whose own form earned him a recall to the side (ironically it had been an injury to Shearer while playing for Manly after the first test against NZ earlier in the year which had seen Kiss called into the side). Kiss' injury restricted him to just 4 games on the Kangaroo Tour with his only try coming in the Kangaroos 26–18 win against Wigan at Central Park in the opening game of the tour. The 1986 Kangaroos would emulate the undefeated 1982 Kangaroo tour, with the 1986 squad earning themselves the nickname "The Unbeatables".

Les Kiss then had a wait of four years before he tasted representative football again. He was selected for games 1 and 2 of the 1990 Origin series. Queensland lost both games and Kiss was one of the players dropped for Game 3 (replaced by Willie Carne). In what turned out to be a brief representative career, Les Kiss played in 4 games for Queensland (all losses) and 4 games for Australia (all wins) scoring a total of 3 Origin and 2 Test tries.

In 2008, rugby league in Australia's centenary year, Kiss was named on the wing of the Bundaberg Rugby League's team of the century.

Coaching career

Kiss worked as an assistant rugby league coach for the London Broncos Super League club and then as joint head coach with former North Sydney teammate Tony Rea.

Rugby union
Kiss worked as a defence coach for the Springboks in South Africa in 2001–02, and was an assistant coach with the New South Wales Waratahs from 2002 until 2008.

Kiss was appointed defensive coach with the Ireland under head coach Declan Kidney in 2009, sharing in a triumphant Grand Slam victory that had eluded Ireland for 61 years in his first year in the job. After Kidney's departure on 2 April 2013, Kiss became the head coach of the Irish team as an interim appointment for their 2013 summer tour to North America. Kiss resumed his role as defence coach after the tour when Joe Schmidt took over late in 2013. On 30 June 2014, Kiss became the interim director of rugby at Ulster, following the departures of Mark Anscombe and David Humphreys.

In January 2018, Kiss announced his resignation as Ulster Director of Rugby.

In March 2018, he and Declan Kidney were reunited when they were appointed by London Irish. Kiss would become head coach with Kidney appointed technical consultant. Kidney has since become Director of Rugby.

References

External links
Australian Rugby League stats
Broncos capture top Aussie
Queensland representatives at qrl.com.au
Ireland Rugby Union profile

1964 births
Fortitude Valley Diehards players
London Broncos coaches
Australian rugby league players
Australian expatriate sportspeople in England
Australian people of Hungarian descent
North Sydney Bears players
Queensland Rugby League State of Origin players
Australia national rugby league team players
Australian rugby league coaches
Australian rugby union coaches
Ulster Rugby non-playing staff
Living people
Rugby league wingers
Australian expatriate sportspeople in Northern Ireland
Rugby league players from Bundaberg